Christopher Bingham (born December 15, 1971) is an American professional racing driver from Kirkland, Washington. He is a noted sports car driver but also competed in stock cars, with eleven Busch Series starts and one ARCA start in his career.

Racing career

Early career
Bingham began his professional racing career when he made four Indy Lights starts in 1997 with a best finish of 11th at Nazareth Speedway. He also participated in the 24 Hours of Daytona in a GT3-class Porsche. He returned to Daytona and made his 12 Hours of Sebring debut in 1998.  In 1999 and 2000 Bingham was the #2 driver for the Hybrid R&D Riley & Scott-Ford Le Mans Prototype team in the American Le Mans Series.  He also passed his Indy Racing League rookie test with Mid-America Motorsports but decided not to pursue an entry into the IRL.  In 2001 and 2002 Bingham drove the works Saleen S7R in the Grand-Am Series' GTS class to back to back championships, including 11 class victories.

NASCAR Busch Series
Bingham decided to foray into NASCAR in 2003, when Bingham signed a deal to drive for Jay Robinson Racing in the Busch Series. He made his debut at North Carolina, starting 38th and finishing 34th after transmission issues. DNFs would plague his season, as Bingham fell out of seven of his eleven starts. Even when he did not fall out, Bingham struggled, earning just a career-best finish of 26th at Darlington and Texas. After his inconsistency, Bingham was released following a 33rd at Charlotte.

Return to sports cars
Bingham returned to the Grand Am Series' Daytona Prototype class in 2004 and began fielding his own entry in 2005. In 2006 he drove Derhaag Motorsports' Daytona Prototype but resigned from the team in August after poor finishes. Earlier that season he was involved in a fistfight with competitor J. C. France after the two collided at Autodromo Hermanos Rodriguez in Mexico City and was suspended for one race and placed on probation.  He did not make any appearances in the series in 2007.

Motorsports career results

NASCAR
(key) (Bold – Pole position awarded by qualifying time. Italics – Pole position earned by points standings or practice time. * – Most laps led.)

Busch Series

ARCA Re/Max Series
(key) (Bold – Pole position awarded by qualifying time. Italics – Pole position earned by points standings or practice time. * – Most laps led.)

References

External links
 Official website 
 

Sportspeople from Kirkland, Washington
NASCAR drivers
1971 births
Living people
Rolex Sports Car Series drivers
Indy Lights drivers
American Le Mans Series drivers
24 Hours of Daytona drivers
Racing drivers from Seattle
Racing drivers from Washington (state)
ARCA Menards Series drivers